Mention may refer to:

 Mention (blogging) a reference to a user's profile in a blog post
 Mention (company) a web monitoring tool